John Chisholm (12 February 1752 – 8 July 1814) was a Roman Catholic bishop who served as the Vicar Apostolic of the Highland District, Scotland.

Life
Born in Strathglass, Inverness on 12 February 1752, he was ordained a priest on 17 April 1775. He was appointed the Vicar Apostolic of the Highland District and Titular Bishop of Oreus by the Holy See on 8 November 1791. He was consecrated to the Episcopate on 12 February 1792. The principal consecrator was Bishop George Hay, Vicar Apostolic of the Lowland District.

In 1801, he founded Lismore Seminary. He died in office on 8 July 1814, aged 62.

References

1752 births
1814 deaths
Apostolic vicars of Scotland
19th-century Roman Catholic bishops in Scotland
People from Inverness
18th-century Roman Catholic bishops in Scotland
Scottish Roman Catholic bishops